Richard Douglas Sandford, VC (11 May 1891 – 23 November 1918) was a Royal Navy officer and a recipient of the Victoria Cross, the highest award for gallantry in the face of the enemy that can be awarded to British and Commonwealth forces. He was a son of the Venerable Ernest Grey Sandford, Archdeacon of Exeter; his great-grandfather was Daniel Sandford, the Bishop of Edinburgh, and his brother was Brigadier Daniel Sandford.

Richard Sandford attended Clifton College whence he joined the Royal Navy. At 26 years old, he was a lieutenant commanding a submarine, HMS C3 in the Royal Navy during the First World War when he took part in the Zeebrugge Raid and won the Victoria Cross. The citation read: 

Sandford died of typhoid fever at Eston Hospital, North Yorkshire, 12 days after the signing of the Armistice, and the day after his last command, HMS G11, had been wrecked on rocks off Howick, Northumberland; his Victoria Cross is displayed at the Britannia Royal Naval College, Dartmouth.

References

External links
Location of grave and VC medal (Cleveland)
Sandford VC (action details & citation)

1891 births
People educated at Clifton College
1918 deaths
Burials in North Yorkshire
Military personnel from Exeter
Deaths from typhoid fever
British World War I recipients of the Victoria Cross
Royal Navy submarine commanders
Infectious disease deaths in England
Royal Navy recipients of the Victoria Cross
Royal Navy officers of World War I